

Winners

Records 
 Most awarded actress: Carmen Salinas with 3 awards
 Most nominated actress: Carmen Salinas with 3 nominations
 Actress who has won 2 consecutive years: Carmen Salinas in 1998 &amp;amp; 1999
 Younger actress who has won: Arleth Teran 24 years for the telenovela Primer amor... a mil por hora in 2001
 Oldest actress who has won: Raquel Olmedo 75 years for the telenovela Abismo de pasion in 2013

References

External links 
TVyNovelas at esmas.com
TVyNovelas Awards at the univision.com

Co-star
Awards for actresses